Reynaldo Alfredo Hipolito (September 4, 1933 – April 12, 2010) was a veteran Filipino slapstick comedian and actor who was at the height of his career in the 1970s and '80s. He was well known for his unusually light build and thin anatomy, earning him the self-deprecating screen name "Palito", which is Spanish for stick and is glossed in Filipino as matchstick or toothpick.

Biography
Palito was born in Calamba, Laguna, near the house of Dr. José Rizal (known as the Rizal Shrine). As a teenager in the 1950s, he took a job as a dishwasher in a restaurant called Alex Soda Fountain, located beside the Cine Odeon along Calle Azcarraga (now C.M. Recto Avenue). The restaurant was frequented by movie stars, and he was discovered by Lauro Santiago of Santiago Productions.

He was only 21 when he first discovered the world of stage acting. A student of Arellano University, he decided to choose acting over his studies around 1959. Palito started as an "extra" in the 1960 Prinsipe Amante movie, starring the then superstar Rogelio dela Rosa. One of his early movies was Pitong Zapata in 1965. His first non-extra role was that as a sidekick of Jun Aristorenas in the late 60s film Bingbong at Dodong. At first, he was cast in straight action films. But because of his thinness, he was groomed as a comedian. He would be seen regularly working with actors Fernando Poe Jr., Dolphy, Chiquito, Niño Muhlach, the comedy trio Tito, Vic and Joey.

In the late 1970s, the decline of Philippine movies and emergence of "Bomba" films hurt Palito's career. The action and comedy films which Palito made were not being made as they used to. Those were the times when Palito lost many of his investments.

In the 1980s, Palito played in Johnny Rambo Tango (1985), Rambuto (1986), No Blood, No Surrender (1985), James Bone Agent 001, and Kumander Kalansalay (1988).

He would also been known as a star in a lot of kitsch Pinoy horror films as a zombie/corpse. His sunken hollow eyes and reed-thin body, while not aesthetically pleasing in the popular sense, fit the corpse-like demeanor that local filmmakers love to utilize.

Palito laid low from Philippine cinema in the '90s, only occasionally playing bit parts, like in the 1992 film by contemporary comedian/actor Dolphy, Home Along The River, a send-up of the popular American Home Alone franchise. In 1993, he acted in Walang Matigas na Buto sa Gutom na Aso.

On June 17, 2004, burgeoning comedy actor Vhong Navarro portrayed Palito in the anthology drama series Maalaala Mo Kaya, focusing on his life story as a survivor of the Japanese occupation during World War II and his heyday as a slapstick comedian during the 1970s and 1980s.

Palito starred in an independent film, Enterpool: Senior Citizen in Action, released 24 August 2005, in the midst of the decline of Philippine cinema. While it was received well by nostalgic movie-goers and local movie critics, it failed to take the general public's notice due to lack of promotion and marketing. His last movie was M.O.N.A.Y. in 2007.

Palito's family, the Hipolitos, sold their house in Pacita Complex in San Pedro, Laguna in 2004 and moved to Imus, Cavite for a smaller place in a low-cost housing subdivision in Cavite.

Once voted as one of the top ten Filipino comedians of all-time, Palito engaged in small stage shows to make a living in his last years. He had a low-paying job performing a live music show Tuesday evenings in a small casino in Santa Cruz, Manila.

Illness and death
In the first quarter of 2010, Palito, a known smoker, was confined to a hospital for a month due to lung problems. After returning home from work on April 6, 2010, he was rushed to the Imus Family Hospital due to complaints of stomach pain. He was later transferred to the ward section of Philippine General Hospital that very night.

Mark Escueta, drummer of the band Rivermaya who worked with Palito for the music video of their single "Ambotsa", was first to announce the news of Palito's illness via Facebook. Several young celebrities called for donations through their respective Twitter accounts while help was extended from showbiz colleagues. Among the visitors was former Philippine president Joseph Estrada.

Palito was declared dead at 7:05 a.m. on April 12, 2010 in the Philippine General Hospital from a lung complication.

Filmography

Film

Television shows
Home Along Da Riles (ABS-CBN)
Home Along Da Airport (ABS-CBN,2003-2005) as Michael
O-Ha! (ABC)
Quizon Avenue (ABS-CBN)
Pwedeng Pwede (ABS-CBN,1999-2001) as Tarzing

References

External links 

1933 births
2010 deaths
Deaths from lung disease
Filipino male comedians
Filipino male film actors
Filipino male television actors
People from Calamba, Laguna
Male actors from Laguna (province)
Tagalog people
20th-century Filipino male actors
21st-century Filipino male actors
Respiratory disease deaths in the Philippines